The 2009 Russian Figure Skating Championships was held from December 24 to 28, 2008 in Kazan. Skaters competed at the senior level in the disciplines of men's singles, ladies' singles, pair skating, and ice dancing. The juniors event was held separately.

Senior results

Men

Ladies

Pairs

Ice dancing

Junior results
The 2009 Russian Junior Figure Skating Championships were held between January 28 and 31, 2009 in Saransk. They were the qualifying competition for the 2009 World Junior Championships.

Men

Ladies

Pairs

Ice dancing

International team selections

World Championships

Europeans Championships
The team to the 2009 European Figure Skating Championships was announced as follows:

World Junior Championships

Winter Universiade
The team to the 2009 Winter Universiade was announced as follows:

References

External links
 Official results
 Russian Junior Nationals 2009
 http://web.icenetwork.com/events/detail.jsp?id=63424

Russian Figure Skating Championships
Russian Figure Skating Championships
Figure skating
Russian Figure Skating Championships
Figure skating
Figure Skating Championships
Figure Skating Championships